Terpzigt is a drainage mill in Marssum, Friesland, Netherlands. It is the smallest spinnenkop, a type of hollow post windmill. The mill is listed as a Rijksmonument, number 8625.

History
The windmill was built in 1888. Before the merger of several waterboards it drained the polder Tolsma. It was restored to working order in 1981 by millwright Dijkstra from Giekerk though it can no longer drain water from the polder, instead it pumps water round in a circuit. In 2011 the windshaft and stocks were replaced.

Description

Terpzigt is what the Dutch describe as a "spinnenkop" (English: spiderhead mill). It is a small hollow post mill winded by a winch. The brake wheel on the windshaft drives the wallower at the top of the upright shaft, which passed through the main post. At the bottom of the upright shaft, the crown wheel drives the Archimedes' screw. The body and substructure are weatherboarded.

Public access
The mill is open to the public by appointment.

References

Windmills in Friesland
Hollow post mills in the Netherlands
Rijksmonuments in Friesland
Windmills completed in 1888
Windpumps in the Netherlands